The 2001–02 George Mason Patriots Men's basketball team represents George Mason University during the 2001–02 NCAA Division I men's basketball season. This was the 36th season for the program, the fifth under head coach Jim Larrañaga. The Patriots played their home games at the Patriot Center in Fairfax, Virginia.

Honors and awards 
Colonial Athletic Association All-Conference Team
 Jesse Young

Colonial Athletic Association All-Defensive Team
 Jon Larranaga

Colonial Athletic Association All-RookieTeam
 Lamar Butler

Roster

Player statistics

Schedule and results

|-
!colspan=12 style=| Non-conference regular season

|-
!colspan=12 style=|CAA regular season

|-
!colspan=12 style=|2002 CAA tournament

|-
!colspan=12 style=|2002 NIT

References

George Mason Patriots men's basketball seasons
George Mason
George Mason
George Mason men's basketball
George Mason men's basketball